Reminiscencia is a steel sculpture by Rafael San Juan, installed near Matute Remus Bridge, in Guadalajara, in the Mexican state of Jalisco. It weighs  and it cost Mex$2.08 million. It was planned in 2015 and it was inaugurated on 26 September 2018 by then-municipal president, Enrique Ibarra Pedroza. It was named reminiscence after its slogan "knowledge is to remember". The sculpture honors Jalisco women.

See also

2018 in art

References

2018 establishments in Mexico
2018 sculptures
Busts in Mexico
Outdoor sculptures in Guadalajara
Sculptures of women in Mexico
Steel sculptures in Mexico